Francis Bulfin (12 February 1874 – 22 March 1951) was an Irish Sinn Féin and Cumann na nGaedheal politician based in Birr, County Offaly, who served as a Teachta Dála (TD) in the 1920s.

He was the brother of William Bulfin. Bulfin was first elected to Dáil Éireann at the 1921 general election to the 2nd Dáil as a Sinn Féin TD for the Leix–Offaly constituency. He was re-elected as a Pro-Treaty Sinn Féin TD to the 3rd Dáil at the 1922 general election, and as a Cumann na nGaedheal TD to the 4th Dáil at the 1923 election.

He lost his seat at the June 1927 general election, when Cumann na nGaedheal lost two of its three seats in the constituency to the new Fianna Fáil party. Bulfin's local party organisation was described as "non-existent" and the party replaced him with a higher-profile candidate in the September 1927 general election.

Francis Bulfin was born a twin, but his twin brother, James Bulfin, died at birth.

References

1874 births
1951 deaths
Cumann na nGaedheal TDs
Members of the 2nd Dáil
Members of the 3rd Dáil
Members of the 4th Dáil
Early Sinn Féin TDs
People from Birr, County Offaly